The 2015 Speedway Grand Prix season was the 70th edition of the official World Championship and the 21st season of the Speedway Grand Prix era, deciding the FIM Speedway World Championship. It was the fifteenth series under the promotion of Benfield Sports International, an IMG company. Greg Hancock was the defending champion from 2014.

Tai Woffinden won the world title, with Hancock second and Nicki Pedersen third. It was Woffinden's second title having also won in 2013.

Qualification 
For the 2015 season there were 15 permanent riders, joined at each Grand Prix by one wild card and two track reserves.

The top eight riders from the 2014 championship qualified automatically. Those riders were joined by the three riders who qualified via the Grand Prix Challenge. Since the winner of the Grand Prix Challenge, Matej Žagar, had already qualified following his fifth position in the 2014 championship, fourth-placed Maciej Janowski qualified.

The final four riders were nominated by series promoters, Benfield Sports International, following the completion of the 2014 season.

Qualified riders

Qualified substitutes 

The following riders were nominated as a substitutes:

Calendar 

The 2015 season consisted of 12 events, just like 2014, although the first Grand Prix was cut short after 12 heats, and the Latvian Grand Prix was awarded after 20 heats.

Classification 

The first Grand Prix was awarded after 12 heats because the riders deemed the track to be unsafe to race. The win went to Matej Žagar, with second place going to Chris Harris and third to Jarosław Hampel.

The fifth Grand Prix was awarded after 20 heats due to a waterlogged track. The win went to Maciej Jankowski, with second place going to Nicki Pedersen and third to Troy Batchelor.

In the twelfth Grand Prix, Australian Jason Doyle was injured in the final and was unable to partake in the rerun.

See also 
 2015 Individual Speedway Junior World Championship
 2016 Speedway Grand Prix

References

External links 
 SpeedwayGP.com – Speedway World Championships

 
2015
Grand Prix